Ado Rõõmussaar (2 June 1891 – 11 March 1970) was an Estonian politician. He was a member of I Riigikogu. He was a member of the Riigikogu since 7 January 1921. He replaced Hans Mitt. On 18 January 1921, he resigned his position and he was replaced by Andres Lilienblatt.

Ado Rõõmussaar was born in Uue-Vändra Parish (now, part of Põhja-Pärnumaa Parish) in Pärnu County. He was a farmer and later worked as an accountant at Vatla manor. From 1917 until 1920, and again from 1930 until 1931, he was the Mayor of Uue-Vändra Parish.

References

1891 births
1970 deaths
Members of the Riigikogu, 1920–1923
Farmers' Assemblies politicians
Mayors of places in Estonia
People from Põhja-Pärnumaa Parish